Joshua Ryne Jung (born February 12, 1998) is an American professional baseball third baseman for the Texas Rangers of Major League Baseball (MLB). He played college baseball for the Texas Tech Red Raiders, and was drafted by the Rangers in the first round of the 2019 MLB draft.

Amateur career
Born and raised in San Antonio, Texas, Jung attended Douglas MacArthur High School, where he played baseball and football. Undrafted out of high school in the 2016 MLB draft, he enrolled at Texas Tech University to play college baseball for the Red Raiders.

In 2017, as a freshman at Texas Tech, Jung started all 62 games at third base, batting .306 with six home runs and 43 RBIs. He was named the Big 12 Freshman of the Year and was named a Freshman All-American by multiple outlets including Collegiate Baseball and Perfect Game/Rawlings. He was also named to the All-Big 12 Freshman Team and the All-Big 12 Second Team. That summer, he played in the California Collegiate League where he hit .368 with two home runs, 31 RBIs, and a .454 on-base percentage over 117 at-bats. As a sophomore in 2018, Jung once again started all 65 of Texas Tech's games at third base, slashing .392/.491/.639 with 12 home runs and 80 RBIs. He was named to the All-Big 12 First Team, and was once again named an All-American by outlets such as Baseball America and Collegiate Baseball. He played for the USA Baseball Collegiate National Team that summer.

Jung was named a preseason All-American by Perfect Game, Baseball America, D1Baseball.com, and Collegiate Baseball prior to his junior year. During the season, he missed two games due to a quadricep strain, ending his streak of 139 consecutive starts. After returning, he moved to shortstop. He was named the 2019 Big 12 Co-Player of the Year (along with Baylor's Davis Wendzel) after batting .333 with nine home runs and 49 RBIs through 49 games. He was named an All-American by Baseball America, D1Baseball.com, Perfect Game, ABCA, and NCBWA. Jung was the recipient of the 2019 Bobby Bragan Collegiate Slugger Award, which honors the top Division I baseball player within Texas, Arkansas, Louisiana, New Mexico and Oklahoma each season. Jung finished his junior year slashing .343/.474/.636 with 15 home runs and 58 RBIs in 64 games.

Considered one of the top prospects for the 2019 MLB draft, he was selected by the Texas Rangers in the first round, with the eighth overall pick.

Professional career

Minor leagues
On July 3, 2019, Jung signed with the Rangers for a $4.4 million signing bonus. On July 10, 2019, Jung made his professional debut with the Arizona League Rangers of the Rookie-level Arizona League, hitting a home run in his first professional at-bat. On July 15, Jung was promoted to the Hickory Crawdads of the Class A South Atlantic League and hit .287/.363/.389/.752 with one home run and 23 RBIs over forty games for them. Jung did not play a minor league game in 2020 due to the cancellation of the minor league season caused by the COVID-19 pandemic. On March 20, 2021, it was announced that Jung would undergo surgery to repair a stress fracture in his foot and miss six to eight weeks. He was activated on June 15 and assigned to the Frisco RoughRiders of the Double-A Central. After slashing .308/.366/.544 with ten home runs and forty RBIs over 43 games, he was promoted to the Round Rock Express of the Triple-A West in mid-August. Over 35 games with Round Rock, Jung slashed .348/.436/.652 with nine home runs, 21 RBIs, and 14 doubles.

Jung entered the 2022 season as the 9th ranked overall prospect in baseball by FanGraphs, and the 26th overall prospect by Baseball America. On February 23, 2022, Jung underwent surgery to repair a torn labrum in his left shoulder. Jung returned to game action at the end of July, first appearing in eight rehab games for the Arizona Complex League Rangers, before returning to Round Rock in August. Over 23 games with Round Rock, he hit .273 with six home runs and 24 RBIs.

Texas Rangers
On September 9, 2022, the Rangers selected Jung's contract from Triple-A and promoted him to the major leagues. He made his MLB debut that night and in his very first at-bat, he hit a home run, making him only the second Rangers player to do so alongside Jurickson Profar. Jung appeared in 26 games for Texas in 2022, hitting .204/.235/.418/.654 with 5 home runs and 14 RBI over 102 plate appearances.

Personal life
Jung's younger brother, Jace Jung, played college baseball at Texas Tech and was a first-round draft pick in 2022.

References

External links

Texas Tech Red Raiders bio

1998 births
Living people
Baseball players from San Antonio
Major League Baseball third basemen
Texas Rangers players
Texas Tech Red Raiders baseball players
United States national baseball team players
Arizona League Rangers players
Arizona Complex League Rangers players
Hickory Crawdads players
Frisco RoughRiders players
Round Rock Express players
Douglas MacArthur High School (San Antonio) alumni